Diego López Aguilar (born 13 November 1983) is a Mexican football manager and former professional footballer who played as a defender. He recently was the manager of Chihuahua F.C.

Career
López made his professional football debut during the 2008–09 Primera División A season, appearing in a fixture against eventual champions Querétaro on 16 November 2008 which Indios lost 2–4. After retirement, in 2011, López became assistant manager to Alberto González at UACH. In August 2016, after five years in the role, López was made manager after González's departure. His first match in charge was a Liga Premier loss to Monterrey Premier on 14 August. López moved into the role of sporting director in June 2019.

Career statistics

Managerial statistics
.

References

External links

1983 births
Living people
People from Chihuahua City
Mexican footballers
Mexican football managers
Association football defenders
Ascenso MX players
Liga Premier de México managers
Indios de Ciudad Juárez footballers
Dorados Fuerza UACH managers